Tuscia is a historical region of Italy that comprised the territories under Etruscan influence and the name adopted for Etruria after the Roman conquest. While it later came to coincide with today's province of Viterbo, it was originally much larger, including the whole region of Tuscany, a great part of Umbria and the northern parts of Lazio.

From 285 AD its capital was Florentia - which would become Florence.

Villages
Civitella d’Agliano
Castel Cellesi
Vejano

References

External links
Tuscia
Tuscia 360
Welcome to Tuscia

Geographical, historical and cultural regions of Italy
Geography of Lazio
Geography of Tuscany
Geography of Umbria